Moses Cabrera (born August 20, 1978) is an American football strength and conditioning coach for the New England Patriots of the National Football League (NFL). He a graduate of Deming High School in Deming, New Mexico. He excelled in academics and sports, he played both offense and defense for the Deming High Wildcats. Moses then went on to continue his studies at Oral Roberts University in Tulsa, Oklahoma, where he earned his B.S. in Exercise Science. He is the current American football head strength and conditioning coach for the New England Patriots of the National Football League (NFL).

Cabrera was hired as the Patriots' head strength and conditioning coach after the departure of Harold Nash to the Detroit Lions. In Cabrera's first year he  was praised for helping the Patriots have the fewest players placed on Injured Reserve during the 2016 NFL Season. He has won three Super Bowl titles as a member of the Patriots staff: Super Bowl XLIX, Super Bowl LI, and Super Bowl LIII.

References

External links
New England Patriots bio

1978 births
New England Patriots coaches
Living people